The 1973 Roanoke International was a men's tennis tournament played on indoor carpet courts at the Roanoke Civic Center in Roanoke, Virginia, in the United States that was part of the 1973 USLTA Indoor Circuit. It was the second edition of the event and was held from January 15 through January 21, 1973. First-seeded Jimmy Connors won his second consecutive singles title at the event and earned $2,500 first-prize money.

Finals

Singles
 Jimmy Connors defeated  Ian Fletcher 6–2, 6–3
 It was Connors' 2nd singles title of the year and the 8th of his career.

Doubles
 Jimmy Connors /  Juan Gisbert Sr. defeated  Ian Fletcher /  Butch Seewagen 6–0, 7–6

References

External links
 ITF tournament edition details

Roanoke International
Roanoke International
Roanoke International